In four-dimensional geometry, a prismatic uniform 4-polytope is a uniform 4-polytope with a nonconnected Coxeter diagram symmetry group. These figures are analogous to the set of prisms and antiprism uniform polyhedra, but add a third category called duoprisms, constructed as a product of two regular polygons.

The prismatic uniform 4-polytopes consist of two infinite families:
 Polyhedral prisms: products of a line segment and a uniform polyhedron.  This family is infinite because it includes prisms built on 3-dimensional prisms and antiprisms.
 Duoprisms: product of two regular polygons.

Convex polyhedral prisms 
The most obvious family of prismatic 4-polytopes is the polyhedral prisms, i.e. products of a polyhedron with a line segment.  The cells of such a 4-polytope are two identical uniform polyhedra lying in parallel hyperplanes (the base cells) and a layer of prisms joining them (the lateral cells).  This family includes prisms for the 75 nonprismatic uniform polyhedra (of which 18 are convex; one of these, the cube-prism, is listed above as the tesseract).

There are 18 convex polyhedral prisms created from 5 Platonic solids and 13 Archimedean solids as well as for the infinite families of three-dimensional prisms and antiprisms.  The symmetry number of a polyhedral prism is twice that of the base polyhedron.

Tetrahedral prisms: A3 × A1

Octahedral prisms: BC3 × A1

Icosahedral prisms: H3 × A1

Duoprisms: [p] × [q] 

The second is the infinite family of uniform duoprisms, products of two regular polygons. 

Their Coxeter diagram is of the form 

This family overlaps with the first: when one of the two "factor" polygons is a square, the product is equivalent to a hyperprism whose base is a three-dimensional prism.  The symmetry number of a duoprism whose factors are a p-gon and a q-gon (a "p,q-duoprism") is 4pq if p≠q; if the factors are both p-gons, the symmetry number is 8p2. The tesseract can also be considered a 4,4-duoprism.

The elements of a p,q-duoprism (p ≥ 3, q ≥ 3) are:
 Cells: p q-gonal prisms, q p-gonal prisms
 Faces: pq squares, p q-gons, q p-gons
 Edges: 2pq
 Vertices: pq

There is no uniform analogue in four dimensions to the infinite family of three-dimensional antiprisms with the exception of the great duoantiprism.

Infinite set of p-q duoprism -  - p q-gonal prisms, q p-gonal prisms:
 3-3 duoprism -  - 6 triangular prisms
 3-4 duoprism -  - 3 cubes, 4 triangular prisms
 4-4 duoprism -  - 8 cubes (same as tesseract)
 3-5 duoprism -  - 3 pentagonal prisms, 5 triangular prisms
 4-5 duoprism -  - 4 pentagonal prisms, 5 cubes
 5-5 duoprism -  - 10 pentagonal prisms
 3-6 duoprism -  - 3 hexagonal prisms, 6 triangular prisms
 4-6 duoprism -  - 4 hexagonal prisms, 6 cubes
 5-6 duoprism -  - 5 hexagonal prisms, 6 pentagonal prisms
 6-6 duoprism -  - 12 hexagonal prisms
 ...

Polygonal prismatic prisms 

The infinite set of uniform prismatic prisms overlaps with the 4-p duoprisms: (p≥3) -  - p cubes and 4 p-gonal prisms - (All are the same as 4-p duoprism)
 Triangular prismatic prism -  - 3 cubes and 4 triangular prisms - (same as 3-4 duoprism)
 Square prismatic prism -  - 4 cubes and 4 cubes - (same as 4-4 duoprism and same as tesseract)
 Pentagonal prismatic prism -  - 5 cubes and 4 pentagonal prisms - (same as 4-5 duoprism)
 Hexagonal prismatic prism -  - 6 cubes and 4 hexagonal prisms - (same as 4-6 duoprism)
 Heptagonal prismatic prism -  - 7 cubes and 4 heptagonal prisms - (same as 4-7 duoprism)
 Octagonal prismatic prism -  - 8 cubes and 4 octagonal prisms - (same as 4-8 duoprism)
 ...

Uniform antiprismatic prism 
The infinite sets of uniform antiprismatic prisms or antiduoprisms are constructed from two parallel uniform antiprisms: (p≥3) -  - 2 p-gonal antiprisms, connected by 2 p-gonal prisms and 2p triangular prisms. 

A p-gonal antiprismatic prism has 4p triangle, 4p square and 4 p-gon faces. It has 10p edges, and 4p vertices.

References 
 Kaleidoscopes: Selected Writings of H.S.M. Coxeter, edited by F. Arthur Sherk, Peter McMullen, Anthony C. Thompson, Asia Ivic Weiss, Wiley-Interscience Publication, 1995, 
 (Paper 22) H.S.M. Coxeter, Regular and Semi-Regular Polytopes I, [Math. Zeit. 46 (1940) 380-407, MR 2,10]
 (Paper 23) H.S.M. Coxeter, Regular and Semi-Regular Polytopes II, [Math. Zeit. 188 (1985) 559-591]
 (Paper 24) H.S.M. Coxeter, Regular and Semi-Regular Polytopes III, [Math. Zeit. 200 (1988) 3-45]
 J.H. Conway and M.J.T. Guy: Four-Dimensional Archimedean Polytopes, Proceedings of the Colloquium on Convexity at Copenhagen, page 38 und 39, 1965
 N.W. Johnson: The Theory of Uniform Polytopes and Honeycombs, Ph.D. Dissertation, University of Toronto, 1966
Four-dimensional Archimedean Polytopes (German), Marco Möller, 2004 PhD dissertation  
 

4-polytopes